Bright Shark is a thriller novel written by Robert Ballard and Tony Chiu. The plot centers on the recent rediscovery of an Israeli Submarine (the I.N.S. Dakar) and its top secret cargo, code named Bright Shark. Now to keep the secret an undersea weapon will be deployed to bury the secret at the cost of global disaster.

References

1992 American novels
American thriller novels
Submarines in fiction
Techno-thriller novels